The name Dinko is a Croatian diminutive of Dominic.
Dinko is a given name. Notable people with the name include:

Dinko Dermendzhiev (born 1941), former Bulgarian football (soccer) player and manager
Dinko Jukić (born 1989), male medley and butterfly swimmer from Austria, born in Croatia
Dinko Mulić (born 1983), Croatian whitewater kayaker
Dinko Ranjina (1536–1607), Croatian poet from the Republic of Ragusa (Dubrovnik)
Dinko Šakić (1921–2008), leader in the army of the fascist Independent State of Croatia (NDH) during World War II
Dinko Šimunović (1853–1933), Croatian writer
Dinko Tomašić (1902–1975), Croatian sociologist and academic
Dinko Zlatarić (1558–1613), Croatian poet and translator from Dubrovnik
Dinkoism

References 

Croatian masculine given names